The Great Santini is a 1979 American drama film written and directed by Lewis John Carlino. It is based on the 1976 novel of the same name by Pat Conroy. The film stars Robert Duvall, Blythe Danner, and Michael O'Keefe.

Synopsis
A U.S. Marine Corps officer whose success as an F-4 Phantom military aviator contrasts with his shortcomings as a husband and father. The film, set in 1962, before widespread American involvement in the Vietnam War, explores the high price of heroism and self-sacrifice.

Plot
A warrior without a war, Lt. Col. Wilbur "Bull" Meechum, a pilot also known as "the Great Santini" to his fellow Marines, moves his family to the military base town of Beaufort, South Carolina, in peacetime 1962. His wife Lillian is loyal and docile, tolerant of Meechum's temper and drinking. Their teenaged children, Ben and Mary Anne, are accustomed to his stern discipline and behave accordingly, while adapting to their new town and school.

Ben's talent at basketball earns him a spot on the school team, and he becomes a dominant player on the court. During one-on-one games with Meechum at home, though, Meechum refuses to let Ben win, using unnecessarily rough physical tactics and humiliating insults and berating the rest of the family when they try to interfere. When Ben finally wins a game, Meechum unleashes a torrent of verbal abuse while bouncing the ball off his head. Later that night, Ben finds Meechum practicing basketball alone in the driveway; Lillian urges Ben not to be angry at him and explains that he is proud of Ben but struggling with a loss of control over things he used to master so easily. During a school game, Meechum orders Ben to strike back against a rival player who has committed a foul on him. Ben tackles the player and breaks his arm, getting himself ejected from the game and dismissed from the team.

Ben befriends a young black man, Toomer Smalls, who is being harassed by bully Red Pettus. Toomer uses a beehive to get revenge on Red, but Red accidentally shoots him. Ignoring Meechum's orders, Ben leaves the house to help Toomer, but he arrives too late and Toomer dies. Meechum is angry for Ben's disobedience, but another Marine tells him that Ben showed courage by choosing to help his friend.

Still unable or unwilling to appreciate Ben's sensitive nature, Meechum accepts one last aerial mission from which he does not return. His engines failing, he chooses to crash his plane into the sea rather than ejecting and letting the aircraft crash into a nearby town. The family leaves Beaufort after his funeral. Ben assumes Meechum's role as the leader of the household, as Bull had intended.

Cast

Production notes
Lewis John Carlino adapted the script from Conroy's novel. Carlino also directed the film. The title character, Lt. Col. Wilbur "Bull" Meechum, aka "The Great Santini", was based on Conroy's father.

The story, for the most part, follows the book. The movie's major divergence is the absence of Ben Meechum's Jewish best friend Sammy. The spelling of the family's surname was also changed from Meecham to Meechum. Also changed is Meechum's aircraft; in the book, he flies and commands a squadron of F-8 Crusaders, while in the film the fighters shown are F-4 Phantom IIs.

Much of the film was shot on location in Beaufort, South Carolina. Tidalholm, the 19th-century house used for the Meechum residence, later was used in The Big Chill (1983).

The film was shot in a 1.85:1 aspect ratio but was only produced in that ratio in the LaserDisc format. Both the VHS and DVD releases are in 1.33:1, also known as full screen or pan and scan. To date the film has not had a release in the Blu-ray format.

Herman Raucher misattribution
Herman Raucher is often credited as a ghostwriter for the feature film. However, Raucher did no work on the film; the misconception arises from the fact that, in the 1980s, Raucher was hired to write a television pilot based on the movie; he only wrote "a couple of pieces," he explained.

Raucher has stated that, into the 2000s, he continued to receive fan mail for Santini and that the volume of letters he received was surpassed only by those for Summer of '42.

Release
Warner Bros. executives were concerned that the film's plot and lack of bankable actors would make it difficult to market. It made its world premiere in Beaufort in August 1979 and was soon released in North Carolina and South Carolina to empty cinemas. Believing the film's title, which implied it was about circus stunts, was the problem, it was tested with other titles: as Sons and Heroes in Fort Wayne, Indiana, as Reaching Out in Rockford, Illinois, and The Ace in Peoria, Illinois. As it tested better in Peoria, The Ace stuck. Even with its new title, the film performed poorly. Orion Pictures pulled the film and sold cable rights to HBO along with the airline rights to recoup its losses.

Producer Charles A. Pratt still had faith in the film and raised enough money (some from Orion) to release The Great Santini in New York City under its original title. It received positive reviews, and business was steady. Two weeks later, it debuted on HBO, and audiences stopped coming. Orion executive Mike Medavoy blamed the film's box-office failure to a lack of a traditional release: screening it first in New York and expanding markets due to word-of-mouth.

Critical reception
The film was well received by critics. On Rotten Tomatoes, the film has a 95% rating, based on 20 reviews, with an average rating of 8/10. Roger Ebert of the Chicago Sun-Times wrote: "Like almost all my favorite films, The Great Santini is about people more than it is about a story. It's a study of several characters, most unforgettably the Great Santini himself, played by Robert Duvall ... There are moments so unpredictable and yet so natural they feel just like the spontaneity of life itself." John Simon of National Review wrote that The Great Santini was "an uneven achievement that nevertheless contains enough of value to justify catching it".

Accolades

In popular culture 
Movies and television have referred to the one-on-one basketball game from The Great Santini during which Bull Meechum repeatedly bounces the ball off of Ben's head while asking "You gonna cry?" Parodies of the scene appear in Austin Powers: The Spy Who Shagged Me and in episodes of The Simpsons and Roseanne. This movie was referred to in season 2 of the television series King of the Hill in the 17th episode "Hank's Dirty Laundry", in which Hank mentions that he had rented and returned this movie 23 times.

The scene is invoked in the father–son tetherball match in Kicking & Screaming, a comedy in which Robert Duvall plays a tough-love father reminiscent of Bull Meechum. Another reference appears in Daddy's Home 2 in a scene featuring Mel Gibson and Mark Wahlberg.

References

External links
 
 
 
 
 
 

1979 films
1979 drama films
American drama films
Films scored by Elmer Bernstein
Films about dysfunctional families
Films based on American novels
Films set in 1962
Films set in South Carolina
Films shot in South Carolina
Films with screenplays by Lewis John Carlino
Orion Pictures films
Warner Bros. films
Films about the United States Marine Corps
Films about American military personnel
Films based on works by Pat Conroy
1970s English-language films
Films directed by Lewis John Carlino
1970s American films